Pycnospatha is a genus of flowering plants in the family Araceae. It contains only two species both of which are tuberous and endemic to Indochina (Laos, Thailand, Cambodia, Vietnam).

Pycnospatha arietina Gagnep. - Thailand, Cambodia, Quan Phu Quoc Island of Vietnam
Pycnospatha palmata Gagnep. - Laos, Thailand

References

Lasioideae
Araceae genera
Flora of Indo-China